Te Quiero (Spanish for I Want/Love You) may refer to:

Te Quiero: Romantic Style In Da World, a 2007 album by Flex
"Te Quiero" (Flex song), a 2007 song on the above album
"Te Quiero" (Ricardo Arjona song), 2012
"Te Quiero" (Stromae song), 2010
Te Quiero (film), a 1978 Mexican romantic drama movie
Te Quiero, a 1985 album by Lucía Méndez, or the title song
"Te Quiero", a 1986 song by Hombres G from the album La cagaste... Burt Lancaster
"Te Quiero", a 2009 song by La 5ª Estación from the album Sin Frenos

See also
Quiero (disambiguation)